The Smuggler's Cave is a 1915 American short drama film directed by  B. Reeves Eason.

Cast
 Jack Richardson
 Vivian Rich
 Walter Spencer

References

External links

1915 films
1915 drama films
1915 short films
American silent short films
American black-and-white films
Silent American drama films
Films directed by B. Reeves Eason
1910s American films